Si Don Chai is a village and tambon (subdistrict) of Thoeng District, in Chiang Rai Province, Thailand. In 2005 it had a population of 4,892 people. The tambon contains nine villages.

References

Tambon of Chiang Rai province
Populated places in Chiang Rai province